McLaren Furnace Room is the first major label album by Canadian band, The Watchmen. Originally released by SUMO Productions in Canada in 1992 (with the help of MCA Records), the release impressed MCA Records Canada who signed the band and released the album in 1993 on a much wider scale. The title of the album refers to the basement of the McLaren Hotel that served as the band's rehearsal studio.

The album was certified Gold in Canada by the Canadian Recording Industry Association on March 6, 1996.

Known as a tireless touring band, they reportedly played 150 shows a year across Canada from 1987 to 1991. A show in Toronto at the Horseshoe Tavern in 1991 caught the attention of producer Chris Wardman's girlfriend. She promised to put Wardman in touch with the band. Wardman eventually made it out to one of their shows and promised them a production commitment.

Jake Gold's The Management Trust signed them to a management deal and his music production outfit SUMO Productions. Using their clout with MCA Records, SUMO was able to release the band's debut McLaren Furnace Room in 1992. The band then signed directly to MCA Records Canada.

At that time in the band's history, the principal songwriter was guitarist Joey Serlin.

A video for the lead single "Cracked" was filmed and released in 1992 while a video for the second single "Run & Hide" was released in 1993. Both videos saw modest play on MuchMusic.

Track listing
All songs and lyrics written by Joey Serlin except for "Cracked" with music written by The Watchmen, and "Sleep", with lyrics by Danny Greaves and music by The Watchmen.

Album credits

Personnel
Sammy Kohn - Drums
Pete Loewen - Bass & Vocals
Joey Serlin - Guitars & Vocals
Danny Greaves - Vocals & Mouth Organ

Additional personnel
Jason Sniderman - Mellotron on "Must To Be Free"
Lazyman lefty - Congas
Kroo-b - Piano
Chris Wardman - Dragon Noises

Production
Chris Wardman - Producer, Mixer
Earl Torno - Mixer, Engineer
Eric Apps - Engineer, Assistant Engineer
Mike Gurarie - Assistant Engineer
Recorded & Mixed at Winfield Sound, Toronto
Mastered by Howie Wienberg at Masterdisk, New York

References
Citations

Sources
 Liner notes from The Watchmen: McLaren Furnace Room.
The Watchmen Bio
The Watchmen - Videos
Watchmen Singer Becomes Doctor
Keep An Eye On Those Watchmen
CRIA Searchable Database

1992 albums
The Watchmen (band) albums